FC Ulvila is a football club from Ulvila, Finland. The club was formed in 1914 as Vanhankylän Alku and their home ground is at the Mynsterin kenttä.   The men's first team currently plays in the Kolmonen (Third Division).

Background

Vanhankylän Alku (abbreviated VAlku) was founded in 1914 and has been known as FC Ulvila since 2007.  The club specialised in football during the 1990s and to date has participated in the lower divisions of the Finnish football league.

The mission of the club is to provide football for all those interested in the sport in the Ulvila area by giving them the opportunity to participate and develop their own potential in accordance with their capabilities. The club aims to provide fresh and vibrant competitive culture that supports development.

Season to season

Club Structure

FC Ulvila run a large number of teams including 1 men's team, 1 ladies team, 7 boys teams and 3 girls teams.  The club has around 300 registered players and since 10 January 2009 has employed a full-time Youth Coach.

2010 season

FC Ulvila are competing in the Kolmonen (Third Division) section administered by the Satakunta SPL.  This is the fourth highest tier in the Finnish football system.  In 2009 they finished in 10th place in the Kolmonen but were reprieved from relegation.

References and sources
Official Website
Finnish Wikipedia
 FC Ulvila (Vanhankylän Alku) Facebook

Footnotes

Football clubs in Finland
1914 establishments in Finland